Justin Bieber: Believe may refer to:

Believe: second studio album by Justin Bieber
Justin Bieber's Believe: sequel film to Justin Bieber: Never Say Never